Nelson Nunes Lobo, also known as Nelson Lobo (born 13 July 1952) is a Capeverdean artist, plastic artist, cubist, impressionist and pointillist.

Biography
Nelson Nunes Lobo was born in Praia to a Portuguese mother and a Cape Verdean father, he was known by art and discovered the passion for design and painting.  He began his first work at the age of eight by wanting his father to paint the landscape in watercolor (at the time a tresor), since that time, his brushes and his paintings never left him. Nelson was inspired by what he sees, he made very little observation. Some of his paintings were compared to Picasso and Miró, he said "but does not compare what is comparable", the artist, then is the artist! Inspiration is the key to success".

At the age of 20, he went to Portugal at studied at the School of Fine Arts, Lisbon.  A new opportunity was offered by him, with a chance to study at the School of Fine Arts, Rotterdam.  Later, he went to France where he tried his luck on his evening class at École Dupérré in Paris.  He would have the chance to exhibit by its biennial amateur artists at Petit Palais (Little Palace).

Since 1995, he exhibits inside Cape Verde and other parts of the world, his work were displayed five times at Praia Cultural Palace.  With more than thirty visitors a day, he was known by in its place of world art.  In 1997, he made a canvas 3 by 2.5 meters.  His acrylic painting being abstract, pointillism and naïve shown at a local bank. He chose to sell and donate his proceeds to an association for aiding the poor in Africa.

Little by little, Nelson became popular, mainly with the success and sold more and more of his paintings, with more and more enthusiasm on his works, displayed at popular places, at public view, in free visits, he made videos of his paintings at a public beach with visitors, made interviews and in short makes himself known...

During the local elections of 2007-08, Nelson was invited by the leader of a political party and painted a mural in the city of Assomada, an advertising incentive for his party.  He replied present to his, lend himself to his challenge, he succeeded.  For some times, at a service station, Enacol, wanted to brush and paint "Senhor Nelson" on his walls.  He completed a fresco measuring 6 meters long and 3 meters wide in ten days.

In June 2009, he received a medal by the Cape Verdean minister of culture Manuel Veiga.

In 2011, he displayed his paintings at the French Cultural Center of Cape Verde, allowed some of his Cape Verdean and French students to freely discover free of charge his works and history.

His projects opened an art gallery, where he freely exhibits, also at a design school.

References

1952 births
Living people
Cape Verdean painters
People from Praia